Gerry Henry (5 October 1920 – 1979) was a professional footballer who played for Leeds United, Bradford Park Avenue, Sheffield Wednesday and Halifax Town. 

Henry played for Yorkshire Schools in 1934 and went on to join Leeds United as a seventeen year old from local junior side Outwood Stormcocks. Henry made a couple of appearances for Leeds United before World War II interrupted his professional football career.

Henry continued playing for the Leeds United throughout the war in the Wartime League. He played 168 times in Wartime League games, scoring an impressive 93 goals, and scored 1 goal in 3 appearances in the Football League War Cup for Leeds. Henry holds the record for most wartime appearances for the club by an individual player. Wartime appearances and goals are typically not acknowledged as counting for career goals and appearance. Henry is one of only around 70 players that have made over 200 appearances for Leeds United if his wartime games are taken into account.

Henry later became player-coach at Halifax and then had a spell as player-manager 27 February 1952 until 15 October 1954. He ceased playing in June 1953.

References

1920 births
1979 deaths
English footballers
English football managers
English Football League players
Association football forwards
Leeds United F.C. players
Leeds United F.C. wartime guest players
Bradford (Park Avenue) A.F.C. players
Sheffield Wednesday F.C. players
Halifax Town A.F.C. players
Halifax Town A.F.C. managers
Huddersfield Town A.F.C. wartime guest players